Ila, formerly Ilevolden, is a tram stop on the Trondheim Tramway, located at Ila, Trondheim in Trondheim, Norway. It was the original terminus of Ilalinjen, the first tramway and opened in 1901. In 1924 it also became a stop for the private Gråkallbanen that ran to Lian. The station featured at first a loop around the park it served, but it was later changed to a turning triangle. The station was the terminus for Line 1 of Trondheim Sporvei until 1971 when it was merged with A/S Graakalbanen and Line 1 was extended to Lian. The stop is also a stop for bus lines 5 and 8, as well as for buses heading to Trolla and Fosen. The stop primarily serves the residential areas at Ila.

References 

Trondheim Tramway stations